"Say You Love Me" is a 1998 song by British soul and pop band Simply Red, released as the second single from their sixth album, Blue (1998). Written by frontman Mick Hucknall, it was quite successful in Europe, peaking at number four in Hungary and number seven in the UK. Additionally, it was a top 20 hit in Austria, Ireland, Italy and Scotland. On the Eurochart Hot 100, the single reached number 24 in May 1998.

Critical reception
Gene Armstrong from the Arizona Daily Star deemed the song a "languorous slow-dance number" and "sultry". Scottish newspaper Daily Record wrote, "Simply Red's latest ballad has all the makings of a summer classic. It's one of the best songs yet by Mick Hucknall, who says he has finally discovered he is a romantic at heart." Gus Bode from The Daily Egyptian noted that it "recall vintage Simply red tracks". Graham Clark from The Yorkshire Times called it "mellow and soulful".

Music video
A music video was produced to promote the single. It was directed by German director Marcus Nispel and filmed in the US.

Track listing
 CD single, Benelux (1998)
"Say You Love Me" — 3:42
"So Jungiful" — 4:46

 CD single, UK & Europe (1998)
"Say You Love Me" — 3:44
"So Jungiful" — 4:46
"So Many People" (Live) — 5:42
"Never Never Love" (Live) — 4:35

Charts

References

 

1998 songs
1998 singles
East West Records singles
Music videos directed by Marcus Nispel
Pop ballads
Simply Red songs
Songs written by Mick Hucknall